Famously Single is an American reality television series that premiered on June 14, 2016, on the E! network. The series follows eight single celebrities who all move in together and try to solve their romantic problems.

Production  
The show premiered on June 14, 2016.

The show was renewed for a second season that premiered on June 25, 2017.

Cast

Season 1
 Brandi Glanville  television personality, known for appearing on The Real Housewives of Beverly Hills.
 Pauly D  television personality and disc jockey, known for starring in MTV's reality show Jersey Shore.
 Aubrey O'Day  singer-songwriter and television personality.
 Josh Murray  television personality, winner of the tenth season of reality competition series The Bachelorette.
 Jessica White  model.
 Willis McGahee  former American football running back.
 Somaya Reece  Latin music artist, appeared on VH1's Love & Hip Hop: New York.
 Calum Best  television personality and model.
 Dr. Darcy Sterling - Relationship Expert, Psychotherapist
 Laurel House - Dating & Empowerment Coach and "Screwing The Rules" Author
 Robert Mack - Positive Psychology Expert and "Love from the Inside Out" Author

Season 2
 Tiffany Pollard  reality television personality on Flavor of Love, I Love New York, New York Goes to Hollywood, New York Goes to Work, Celebrity Big Brother, Family Therapy with Dr. Jenn, Botched and The Next:15.
 Dorothy Wang  reality television personality known from Rich Kids of Beverly Hills.
 Malika Haqq  reality television personality known for appearing on Hollywood Divas, Dash Dolls, Keeping Up with the Kardashians and its spin-offs.
 Karina Smirnoff  professional dancer from Dancing with the Stars.
 Ronnie Ortiz-Magro  reality television star on Jersey Shore.
 Chad Johnson  reality television personality on The Bachelorette.
 David McIntosh  fitness model.
 Calum Best  British socialite.
 Dr. Darcy Sterling - Relationship Expert, Psychotherapist
 Robert Mack - Positive Psychology Expert and "Love from the Inside Out" Author

Episodes

Season 1 (2016)

Season 2 (2017)

Broadcast
The series debuted in the United States on June 14, 2016. Internationally, the series premiered in Australia on the local version of E! on June 16, 2016.

References

External links 
 
 
 

2010s American reality television series
2016 American television series debuts
English-language television shows
Television shows set in Los Angeles
E! original programming
2017 American television series endings